Sclerolinon is a monotypic genus of flowering plants in the flax family containing the single species Sclerolinon digynum, which is known by the common name northwestern yellowflax. It is native to the western United States where it is known from Washington and Idaho through central California; however, it may now be extirpated from Idaho. It grows in seasonally wet habitat such as mountain meadows and vernal pools. This is an annual herb producing a hairless, erect stem up to 20 centimeters tall. The leaves are oval in shape, the upper ones with serrated edges. They are oppositely arranged about the stem and grow erect instead of spreading away from the stem. The inflorescence is a cyme of flowers surrounded by serrated, leaflike bracts. The flower has five yellow petals in a calyx of toothed sepals.

References

External links
Jepson Manual Treatment
USDA Plants Profile
Photo gallery

Linaceae
Monotypic Malpighiales genera
Flora of the United States